Mariia Persidskaia (born 28 December 1991) is a Russian judoka.

She is the bronze medallist of the 2017 Judo Grand Prix Tbilisi in the -48 kg category.

References

External links
 

1991 births
Living people
Russian female judoka
Universiade medalists in judo
Universiade bronze medalists for Russia
Medalists at the 2017 Summer Universiade
21st-century Russian women